Navin Chawla (born 30 July 1945) is a retired Indian civil servant and writer, who served as 16th Chief Election Commissioner of India. Four phases (out of five) of the Indian general election to the Lok Sabha, the lower house of the Indian Parliament, were executed under his supervision in April and May 2009.

Chawla is best known for his biography of Mother Teresa and for conducting the 2009 general elections, despite concerns about his leanings towards the Congress Party. Action was taken against alleged malpractice by Congress governments in Rajasthan, Assam and Andhra Pradesh and the Congress-Allied government in Tamil Nadu. According to his family, Chawla was deeply influenced by Mother Teresa and decided not to resign from the civil service in 1997 in accordance with her advice.

Early life and education
Chawla was born on 30 July 1945 in New Delhi. He studied at the Lawrence School, Sanawar, Himachal Pradesh from 1953 to 1961 (when he received his Senior School Certificate), and received a Government of India scholarship for his first two years at the Lawrence School. Chawla received a B.A. (Hons.) in history from St. Stephen's College, Delhi in 1966 and a B.A. (Hons.) in history from London University in 1967. He received a diploma in social administration from the London School of Economics in 1968. Chawla was appointed a Fellow of Queen Elizabeth House at Oxford University in 1996.

Career
Chawla is an Indian Administrative Service officer from the class of 1969. He rose to the highest rank of Secretary to the Government of India. He served as a magistrate and later commissioner of the Union Territory of Delhi. He was appointed the first Chairman of the Delhi Vidyut (Electricity) Board. He was appointed Election Commissioner in 2005, succeeding B. B. Tandon (who was promoted to Chief Election Commissioner of India) and helped pioneer the open skies policy as Joint Secretary in the Ministry of Information and Broadcasting  ( 1992–96 ). Chawla was appointed India's 16th Chief Election Commissioner on 21 April 2009. He conducted the General Election of 2009. He wrote Mother Teresa's best selling official biography, Mother Teresa.

Earlier posts
He occupied a number of posts both in the Central Government as well as Union Territories of Delhi, Lakshadweep and Pondicherry, becoming Additional Secretary and Secretary to the Government of India. These appointments were made during the Prime Ministership under the NDA Government headed by Prime Minister Vajpayee of the BJP.

As Chief Election Commissioner
Chawla has undertaken reforms of the electoral process and the election commission. He advocated a constitutional process for the removal of election commissioners, bringing it in line with that for removal of the chief election commissioner, so that election commissioners were afforded the same constitutional protection given to the CEC Chawla ensured that third gender individuals were given the right to vote for the first time. They had been left out of the democratic process, since they could not register as male or female. They could now register in a new category called  "Other". The issue was first broached by students at KIIT Law School, Bhubaneswar and Asia College of Journalism, Chennai. This human rights initiative was emulated by many other organizations in India and elsewhere.  He also supported including the participation in the electoral process of under-trials in India. He believed that under-trials should be allowed to vote, especially as convicts could participate in the electoral process and even stand for election. He enlisted leprosy sufferers in electoral polls and encouraged braille liberate voters to vote independently.

Association with Mother Teresa

Deeply influenced by Mother Teresa, he wrote her bestselling biography (translated in 14 languages). Almost half a million copies have already been sold. Substantial royalties have been donated to the cause of leprosy. Because of her influence, he has set up two NGOs which provide free medicines to leprosy patients, and free vocational training to healthy children of leprosy parents, which also includes beauty training given free by noted beautician Shahnaz Husain, as well as computer training programmes. Free education is provided to disabled children drawn from Below Poverty Line families. Presently, 130 such kids and youth attend the Lepra India Trust School in Delhi. Meanwhile, at the 'Darshan School', of which Chawla is Chairman, there are 52 Hearing Impaired children divided into seven classes of almost nine children per class as per the international norm. 20-30 boys and girls who are profoundly hearing impaired are taught Computer Software and helped with employment. All services are free, including hearing aids (two per child) provided by Starkey Corporation.

Societal Contributions
Chawla is Founder Chairman of the Jaipur-based Lala Chaman Lal Education Trust, called 'Darshan' (Darshan Website), which looks after disabled hearing-impaired children.  which had obtained MPLADS funds from Congress MPs Aimaduddin Khan and R. P. Goenka . This amounted to only 20% of the total expenditure. The trust was allotted  of land by the Congress government in Rajasthan when Ashok Gehlot was Chief Minister.. All facilities are provided free of charge. Al present 64 hearing-impaired children are taught by special educators. Computer S/w is taught to older students.

Navin Chawla is running another trust called the Lepra India Trust in Delhi which is focused on the treatment of leprosy-affected cases, almost 20,000 street cases have been attended by Lepra doctors The trust also teaches hear impaired children and children belonging to poor family. All conditions under the MPLAD act are scrupulously adhered too. Chawla provides for free services for all the children. He has obtained employment for many youth.

Navin Chawla was invited on 16 February 2015 to distribute 'Smart Canes' to visually impaired students of Delhi University, during the course of the Antardhwani festival. An important part of the festival that mattered greatly to the cause of disability, was distribution of "smart canes" to the first batch of visually impaired students. By June, it was hoped to distribute these canes to all those suffering from visual disability, including students and teachers alike, numbering about 200.

Leprosy 
Chawla has endorsed Justice A. P. Shah, Chairman of the Law Commission's recent recommendation that the 117-year-old Lepers Act is highly discriminatory and must be removed from the statute book, and replaced by a more humane law that takes into account that leprosy is now fully curable. A new law also needs to be implemented with understanding and compassion.

Alleged links with Congress rejected
In March 2006 the National Democratic Alliance presented the President of India, A. P. J. Abdul Kalam, with a memorandum for his removal signed by over 200 MPs. The memorandum questioned his impartiality in light of alleged links with the Indian National Congress. This was rejected by the Government.

Apprehensive about Chawla's alleged links to the Gandhi Family, in May 2006 Jaswant Singh, opposition leader in Rajya Sabha, appealed to the Supreme Court of India for Chawla's removal as election commissioner because of his lifelong association with Congress politicians and the MPLADS controversy. The Chief Election Commissioner, N Gopalaswami suo moto, without consulting the full Commission or Election Commissioner Quraishi, filed an affidavit with the Supreme Court that he had the power to remove an election commissioner (EC). Following upon this, the Bharatiya Janata Party (BJP) then withdrew its petition. The Supreme Court ruled, "We are allowing withdrawal of the petitions while keeping open all questions [raised in the petitions]. They can make representation to the CEC, who will decide such representation in accordance with law. We are not expressing any opinion on merits".

On 31 January 2009, Chief Election Commissioner N. Gopalaswami unusually and without consulting the full Commission or Commissioner Quraishi received a small NDA delegation in his private chamber. Based on that, sent his recommendation about Chawla's removal as election commissioner to the President of India. Based on that the CEC alleged that Chawla had discharged his duties as election commissioner in a partisan manner, seeking to further the interests of "one party". The CEC alleged that Chawla had shared some information about the election commission to Congress Party officials. He is also reported to have opposed the election commission's notice to Sonia Gandhi for accepting honours from Belgium. Chawla and Quraishi in a two-to-one majority judgment had dismissed the complaint against Sonia Gandhi.

The CEC, N. Gopalaswam's recommendation against Chawla, was in itself seen as controversial by several eminent jurists including Fali Nariman. and it was rejected by the President of India. Chawla became CEC of India on 20 April 2009, and concluded the 2009 Indian Parliamentary Election.

In order to stall Chawla becoming the CEC, two BJP lawyers and office bearers tried to petition a local Jaipur court for an FIR against Chawla and senior officials of the government of Rajasthan about the allotment of land to Chawla's trusts in Jaipur by the Jaipur Development Authority in 2000. The court declined to order the filing of an FIR; in an order dated 10 February 2009, the Court said it was satisfied by a Police investigation that there was nothing wrong. The Court dismissed the complaint.
. The Shah Commission, an independent commission headed by former Chief Justice of India Jayantilal Chhotalal Shah which investigated atrocities during the Emergency, said in its final report that Chawla was "unfit to hold any public office which demands an attitude of fair play and consideration for others". The Delhi High Court ( Justice TPS Chawla) however dismissed the Report of the Shah Commission [The Honble Justice TPS Chawla judgement, High Court of Delhi, Criminal Original Jurisdiction, Criminal Misc ( Main). Number 540 of 1978 New Delhi, Dated 7 November 1978.]

Awards
 2005 Mazzini Award from the government of Italy "in recognition of his efforts to forge a new relationship with Italy and strengthening existing bonds"
 2004 award from the New Delhi Institution of Directors
 NDTV-Icon of the year 2009
 NDTV-Icon of the year 2013
 In 2014 -Bhartiya Vidhya Bhavan, Mumbai Award for conducting of election

Bibliography
 1988: "The Vocational Rehabilitation and Social Re-integration of the Leprosy Affected in India" (report released at the India International Centre in New Delhi by Mother Teresa on 18 October 1988)
 1992: authorised biography, Mother Teresa; translated into 14 languages in India and abroad
 1996: Faith and Compassion – The Life and Work of Mother Teresa (with photographer Raghu Rai); Element Books (UK and US), translated into Dutch and Spanish

Further reading

References

External links

 Lectures
 Conferences
 "Navin Chawla to be I&B secretary"  – article in The Hindu dated 29 May 2004
 "Italy honours Navin Chawla"  – article in The Hindu dated 17 March 2005
 "Navin Chawla, new poll commissioner"  – article in The Hindu dated 15 May 2005
 "BJP asks Navin Chawla to step down"  – article in the Hindu dated 7 February 2006
 "NDA team seeks Chawla's removal"  – article in the Hindu dated 17 March 2006

"Don't damage EC credibility''" – article in the Asian Age 14 March 2008
"Chief Election Commissioner Gopalaswami 'recommends' removal of Navin Chawla''" -article in the Hindu dated 31 January 2009
"Parties term CEC's action unfortunate"  -article in the Hindu dated 1 February 2009
"CEC's action damages institution: Nariman"  -article in the Hindu dated 1 February 2009
"Shocking constitutional overreach" -article in the Hindu dated 1 February 2009
"Gopalaswami's claims on timing of missive are seriously misleading" -article in the Hindu dated 3 February 2009
"How Chief Election Commissioner pursued BJP allegations" -article in the Hindu dated 3 February 2009
"Chief Election Commissioner cannot act on his own: Ashok Desai opinion"  -article in the Hindu dated 3 February 2009
"Chief Election Commissioner: equal or superior?”  -article in the Hindu dated 9 February 2009
  -article in the Hindu dated 6 May 2009
"Cong accuses EC of bias, says complaints ignored" – article in Hindustan Times dated 8 May 2009
 "EC did great job; can it be better? " - article in Deccan Chronicle dated 14 May 2009
 "A job well done"   -article in the Hindu dated 15 May 2009

Indian civil servants
Chief Election Commissioners of India
People from Delhi
St. Stephen's College, Delhi alumni
1945 births
Living people
Delhi University alumni
Lawrence School, Sanawar alumni